is a system on a chip (SoC) company formed in March 2015 from former system LSI businesses of Fujitsu and Panasonic. It has about 2,500 employees worldwide and is headquartered in Yokohama, Japan. It is privately held by the Development Bank of Japan, Fujitsu, and Panasonic.

Socionext Europe is headquartered in Langen, near Frankfurt, with other locations in Munich, Maidenhead (UK) and Linz (Austria).

Socionext America Inc. (SNA) is the US branch of Socionext Inc. headquartered in Santa Clara, California. The company is a fabless ASIC supplier, specializing in a wide range of standard and customizable SoC solutions for automotive, consumer, and industrial markets.

References 

Manufacturing companies based in Yokohama
Electronics companies established in 2015
Japanese companies established in 2015
Semiconductor companies of Japan
Fabless semiconductor companies
System on a chip
Fujitsu
Panasonic
Joint ventures